Lung Cheung Government Secondary School (LCGSS) is a government secondary school in Wong Tai Sin, Hong Kong.

Lung Cheung Government Secondary Technical School was established in 1970. Originally it was only for boys. It became coeducational and an academic-focused institution in 2010.

In 1997, Sun Yin-wai was the principal. That year, he stated that the school's approach was a "whole-school" scheme which included a programme focusing on morality and civics.

, Clark Chan Cheung-lam is the principal. In 2018, the school began allowing the usage of its facilities to outside groups as part of a government scheme to make more flexible land use. The Hong Kong Rope Skipping Association had inquired about using Lung Cheung's facilities.

Every year the school has a speech day.

References

External links

 Lung Cheung Government Secondary School 
 English Department
  (list of government technical schools) - Hong Kong Government

Wong Tai Sin
Secondary schools in Hong Kong
1970 establishments in Hong Kong
Educational institutions established in 1970
Technical schools
Boys' schools in Hong Kong